Jeżyce  (formerly German Altenhagen) is a village in the administrative district of Gmina Darłowo, within Sławno County, West Pomeranian Voivodeship, in north-western Poland.

For the history of the region, see History of Pomerania.

The village has a population of 272.

References

Villages in Sławno County